Cottus rondeleti is a species of freshwater ray-finned fish belonging to the family Cottidae, the typical sculpins. This species is endemic to the coastal Hérault drainage of Southern France. The total known distribution comprises three distinct short stretches of stream, and the species considered critically endangered because of threat of drought that is promoted by water extraction and potentially by climate change.

This species was described as a separate species from the European bullhead (C. gobio) in 2005 by Jörg Freyhof, Maurice Kottelat and Arne W. Nolte. The specific name honours Guillaume Rondelet, a pioneer of European ichthyology.

See also
Cottus petiti

References

Freyhof, J., M. Kottelat and A. Nolte, 2005. Taxonomic diversity of European Cottus with description of eight new species (Teleostei: Cottidae). Ichthyol. Explor. Freshwat. 16(2):107-172. 

Endemic fish of Metropolitan France
Freshwater fish of Europe
Cottus (fish)
Fish described in 2005
Taxa named by Jörg Freyhof
Taxa named by Maurice Kottelat